Redmond-Bate v Director of Public Prosecutions [1999] EWHC Admin 733, was a case heard before the Queen's Bench Division of the High Court regarding freedom of speech and breach of the peace. The decision upheld the freedom to express lawful matters in a way which other people might take great exception to; that the right to free speech, enshrined in Article 10 of the European Convention of Human Rights, includes the right to be offensive; and a police officer has no right to call upon a citizen to desist from lawful conduct. That others might react unlawfully does not itself render the actions of the speaker unlawful.

Facts
On 2 October 1997, the appellant, Alison Redmond-Bate, and two other women, all members of an evangelistic Christian organization, were preaching outside Wakefield Cathedral. The police received complaints about them  and a policeman warned the three women not to interrupt people walking by. They ignored him, and after twenty minutes, a crowd of more than a hundred people had gathered (most of which showed hostility towards the three women). The policeman once again asked the women to stop preaching, and when they refused to do so, they were arrested. Redmond-Bate was later convicted at Wakefield Magistrates Court and charged with "obstructing a police officer in the execution of his duty."

The appeal to the High Court concerned the following questions of law:
"In the circumstances of this case, was it reasonable for the police officer to arrest the appellant who had not conducted herself in a manner which would be said to constitute an offence under the Public Order Act 1986 when any apprehension by the police officer of violence or threat of violence which could be said to be likely to breach criminal law emanated from others present?"
"Whether it was proper for the Court to conclude that such actual or threatened violence was or would be the natural consequence of the appellant’s actions?"

Judgment
Sedley LJ's opinion was as follows.

References

External links
Full transcript at BAILII

High Court of Justice cases
1999 in case law
1999 in British law